Angel Baby may refer to:
"Angel Baby" (Dean Martin song), a 1958 single by Dean Martin
"Angel Baby" (Rosie and the Originals song), a 1960 single by Rosie and the Originals
"Angel Baby" (Troye Sivan song), a 2021 single by Troye Sivan
Angel Baby (1961 film), starring George Hamilton and Mercedes McCambridge
Angel Baby (1995 film), starring John Lynch and Jacqueline McKenzie
"Angel Baby (Don't You Ever Leave Me)", a song by Darrell Banks